Marine Corps Air Station Cherry Point or MCAS Cherry Point (*)  is a United States Marine Corps airfield located in Havelock, North Carolina, United States, in the eastern part of the state. It was built in 1941, and was commissioned in 1942 and is currently home to the 2nd Marine Aircraft Wing.

History
Congress authorized Marine Corps Air Station Cherry Point on July 9, 1941, with an initial appropriation of $14,990,000 for construction and clearing of an 8,000 acre (32 km2) tract of swamps, farms and timberland.

Actual clearing of the site began on August 6, 1941, with extensive drainage and malaria control work. Construction began in November just 17 days before the attack on Pearl Harbor.

On May 20, 1942, the facility was commissioned Cunningham Field, named in honor of the Marine Corps' first aviator, Lieutenant Colonel Alfred A. Cunningham. The completed facility was later renamed Marine Corps Air Station Cherry Point, after a local post office situated among cherry trees.

Cherry Point's primary World War II mission was to train units and individual Marines for service to the Pacific theater. The air station also served as a base for anti-submarine operations, with an Army Air Forces (22d Antisubmarine Squadron) and later a Navy squadron each being responsible for the sinking of a German U-boat just off the North Carolina coast during 1943.

Cherry Point's contribution to the Korean War effort was to provide a steady stream of trained aviators and air crewmen as well as maintenance and support personnel as replacements to forward deployed aviation units.

During the Vietnam War, Cherry Point deployed three A-6 Intruder squadrons to the Far East and again provided a constant source of replacements for aircrews and enlisted aviation personnel.

In Operation Desert Storm, Cherry Point was a major contributor to the victory in Southwest Asia by supporting the deployment of three AV-8B Harrier squadrons, two A-6E Intruder squadrons, one KC-130 Hercules squadron, one EA-6B Prowler squadron, and headquarters detachments from Marine Aircraft Group 14, Marine Aircraft Group 32, and the 2nd Marine Aircraft Wing.

Cherry Point marines and sailors participated in strike missions and follow-on operations in Afghanistan and its surrounding region during Operation Enduring Freedom, which was initiated on October 7, 2001.

On September 8, 2007, the headquarters building (198) was gutted by a fire. The groundbreaking ceremony for the new Headquarters Building was on 29 July 2009, with completion planned for sometime in 2011.

The air station and its associated support locations occupy more than 29,000 acres (120 km2). Its runway system is large enough that the air station served as an alternate emergency landing site for the Space Shuttle launches out of Cape Canaveral, Florida.

In 2013, Cherry Point hosted warfighters, technology teams and testers under the flags of 10 nations and each of the U.S. military services for the 11th Bold Quest coalition demonstration. The Joint Staff, J6 Joint Deployable Analysis Team (JDAT) led the test plan design, execution control, and emplaced the necessary infrastructure to connect the numerous geographic sites across seven states. Cherry Point was chosen for its ideal location for hosting East Coast military assets, two Navy ships, Arleigh Burke-class destroyer USS Jason Dunham (DDG-109) and Ticonderoga-class cruiser USS San Jacinto (CG-56).

USAF use
On 1 July 1957 the United States Air Force (USAF) 614th Airborne Control and Warning Squadron established an Air Defense Command Phase I Mobile Radar station (M-116) at Cherry Point. This station was part of the planned deployment of forty-four Mobile radar stations.  The USAF activated an AN/FPS-6 and two AN/FPS-8 radars located adjacent to Base Flight Operations.  These radars were placed on top of  towers without radomes, and initially the station functioned as a Ground-Control Intercept (GCI) and warning station.  As a GCI station, the squadron's role was to guide interceptor aircraft toward unidentified intruders picked up on the unit's radar scopes.

In addition to the radars on the air station, two unmanned AN/FPS-14 "Gap Filler" sites, one at Engelhard, NC (M-116B)  and one at Holly Ridge, NC (M-116C)  were set up for additional coverage.

One of the AN/FPS-8s was damaged by Hurricane Donna in 1960. The radars were turned over to the Navy on 30 April 1960, and the Marine Corps retained the other undamaged AN/FPS-8 radar for a number of years for base air traffic control.

During 1961 M-116 joined the Semi Automatic Ground Environment (SAGE) system, initially feeding data to DC-04 at Fort Lee AFS, Virginia.  After joining, the squadron was re-designated as the 614th Radar Squadron (SAGE) on 1 March 1963.  The radar squadron provided information 24/7 the SAGE Direction Center where it was analyzed to determine range, direction altitude speed and whether or not aircraft were friendly or hostile.

USAF radar operations continued at MCAS Cherry Point until 1 August 1963 when budget reductions and a general draw-down of antiaircraft radar sites closed the facility.

Based units 
Flying and notable non-flying units based at MCAS Cherry Point.

United States Marine Corps 
Marine Corps Installations – East

 Headquarters and Headquarters Squadron – UC-35D Citation

2nd Marine Logistics Group

 Combat Logistics Regiment 25 (CLR-25)
 Combat Logistics Company 21 (CLC-21)

2nd Marine Aircraft Wing

 Marine Wing Headquarters Squadron 2

 Marine Air Control Group 28
 2d Low Altitude Defense Battalion (2D LAAD Bn)
 Marine Air Control Squadron 2 (MACS-2)
 Marine Air Support Squadron 1 (MASS-1)
 Marine Tactical Air Command Squadron 28 (MATCS-28)
 Marine Wing Communications Squadron 28 (MWCS-28)

 Marine Aircraft Group 14
 Marine Aerial Refueller Squadron 252 (VMGR-252) – KC-130J Hercules
 Marine Attack Squadron 223 (VMA-223) – AV-8B Harrier II
 Marine Attack Squadron 231 (VMA-231) – AV-8B Harrier II
 Marine Attack Squadron 542 (VMA-542) – AV-8B Harrier II
 Marine Attack Training Squadron 203 (VMAT-203) – AV-8B Harrier II and TAV-8B Harrier II
 Marine Aviation Logistics Squadron 14 (MALS-14)
 Marine Unmanned Aerial Vehicle Squadron 2 (VMU-2) – RQ-21A Blackjack
 Marine Wing Support Squadron 271 (MWSS-271)

 Marine Aviation Training Support Group 42 
 Marine Attack Training Squadron 203 (VMAT-203)  Squadron Augment Unit – AV-8B Harrier II and TAV-8B Harrier II

United States Navy 
Naval Air Systems Command

 Fleet Readiness Center East

Supported facilities
MCAS Cherry Point also maintains a satellite field at MCALF Bogue a manned installation in Bogue, Carteret County North Carolina at MCALF Oak Grove, an unmanned training field in Jones County and an outlying airfield at MCOF Atlantic in Carteret County with a skeleton crew near Atlantic, North Carolina. Several former outlying landing fields have been converted to regional airports, such as MCOF Greenville, MCAA Kinston, MCASE near Edenton NC and MCOF New Bern.

See also

Marine Corps Auxiliary Landing Field Bogue
Proposed Outlying Landing Field in North Carolina
United States Marine Corps Aviation
List of United States Marine Corps installations
List of airports in North Carolina
 List of USAF Aerospace Defense Command General Surveillance Radar Stations

References
Notes

Bibliography

Web
MCAS Cherry Point's official website

External links

 Marine Corps Air Station Cherry Point
MCAS Cherry Point's official DVIDS page
USMC Life Cherry Point An Insider's Guide to Cherry Point Marine Base
MCAS Cherry Point at GlobalSecurity.org
USMC Air Station Cherry Point Overview & PCS Information (MarineCorpsUSA.org)

Military installations in North Carolina
Military Superfund sites
Populated places established in 1941
Populated places in Craven County, North Carolina
Populated places on the Neuse River
Radar stations of the United States Air Force
Superfund sites in North Carolina
active
World War II airfields in the United States
Military installations established in 1942
1941 establishments in North Carolina
Buildings and structures in Craven County, North Carolina
Space Shuttle Emergency Landing Sites